Menna R. Clatworthy is a British immunologist who is Professor of Translational Medicine at the University of Cambridge. She studies human tissue immunity. She is a Fellow of the Academy of Medical Sciences and was elected to the European Molecular Biology Organization in 2022.

Early life and education 
Clatworthy completed an undergraduate degree in medicine. She specialised in nephrology at the University of Cambridge, where she undertook a doctorate in medicine. She was supported by the British Renal Association Raine Award.

Research and career 
Clatworthy looks to understand the types of immune cells that live within human organs, and how their local environment impacts their function. She studies human tissue immunity in lymphoid and non-lymphoid organs. She makes use of single cell genome sequencing and advanced imaging to uncover how environmental cues shape immune responses in health and disease. Clatworthy established the Cambridge Tissue Immunity Laboratory. As part of this, she is responsible for the kidney cell atlas and the bladder cell atlas.

Clatworthy has studied the role of the immune system in neurological disorders, including Parkinson's disease and depression. To do this, she made use of a mouse model. She noticed that plasma cells within the dura (the outer part of the meninges) were aligned along the border of the dural venous sinuses. On further investigation, Clatworth realised that these antibodies were producing Immunoglobulin A, antibodies which are typically found in the gut. She investigated the origins of these bacteria, and showed that they originated in the intestine. She argued that these antibodies flow to the dural venous sinuses to protect the brain from microbes.

Clatworthy was elected to the Academy of Medical Sciences in 2020 and the EMBO in 2022. During the COVID-19 pandemic, Clatworthy investigated the immune responses of people who suffered severe and asymptomatic COVID-19.

Selected publications

References

Academics of the University of Cambridge
Women immunologists
Fellows of the Academy of Medical Sciences (United Kingdom)
Members of the European Molecular Biology Organization
Living people
Alumni of the University of Cambridge
21st-century British scientists
Year of birth missing (living people)